The Yale Institute of Sacred Music (ISM) is a joint venture between the Yale School of Music and Yale Divinity School focused on the study of music, visual arts, literature, liturgy, and other forms of the arts.

M.M., M.M.A., or D.MA. students in the Yale School of Music pursue concentrations at the ISM in

 organ
 voice
 choral conducting   
 performance 
 composition
 church music studies

M.A.R. students at Yale Divinity School pursue concentrations at the ISM in

 Liturgical Studies
 Religion and Music 
 Religion and Literature
 Religion and the Arts

Students in the M.Div. and S.T.M. programs at Yale Divinity School can also pursue study at the ISM.

The Institute traces its roots to the School of Sacred Music founded at Union Theological Seminary in New York City.  The seminary's department of church music was brought to Yale in 1972, entering into partnership with the Yale School of Music and the Yale Divinity School. The institute offers programs in organ performance, choral conducting, liturgical studies, voice, and religion and the arts.

References

External links
Institute of Sacred Music

Religious music
Yale University
Educational institutions established in 1972